Antonín Dvořák's String Quintet No. 2 in G major, Op. 77 (B. 49), was originally composed in early March 1875 and first performed on March 18, 1876 in Prague at the concert of the Umělecká beseda.

It is scored for two violins, viola, cello, and double bass. First marked as Op. 18, it was later slightly revised in 1888 as Op. 77. It has since been assigned the Burghauser number B. 49. Dvořák entered the piece in a competition and was awarded 5 ducats for the composition. The work bears the competition's motto, "To my Nation", as its dedication.

Although the original work was scored in five movements, Dvořák later withdrew the second movement, entitled "Intermezzo," due to concerns that having two slow movements made the work too lengthy. This extracted movement had been based on the central section, marked 'Andante religioso', of his String Quartet No. 4 (which was not published in his lifetime), and was in turn later reworked and republished as the Nocturne for Strings in B major, Op. 40 (B. 47). Some modern ensembles choose to restore the intermezzo when performing the work.

The work was published in 1888 by Simrock, not under its original opus number 18, but as Opus 77.

Structure 
The quintet consists of four movements:

Selected recordings 
String Quintet No. 2, String Sextet. CD Supraphon (11 1461-2 131).
The Chamber Music Society of Lincoln Center: Dvorak Serenade. Perf. Joseph Silverstein, Ani Kavafian, Paul Neubauer, Gary Hoffman, Edgar Meyer. CD. Delos, 1995.

References

External links

String Quintet No. 2 on a comprehensive Dvorak site
Performance of String Quintet No. 2 by The Chamber Music Society of Lincoln Center from the Isabella Stewart Gardner Museum in MP3 format

String quintets by Antonín Dvořák
1875 compositions
Compositions in G major